The frequency modulation radio broadcast band in Japan is 76-95 MHz. The 90-108 MHz section was used for television for VHF channels 1, 2 and 3 until the analog shutdown occurred on July 24, 2011. The narrowness of the Japanese band (19 MHz compared to slightly more than 20 MHz for the CCIR band; until the mid-2010s, it was a 14 MHz band) limits the number of FM stations that can be accommodated on the dial.

In late 2013, the Ministry of Internal Affairs and Communications published a report proposing the expansion of the FM band to 95 MHz; at the time, the Japanese FM band was from 76-90 MHz. Many stations that had been previously only available on the AM band were issued preliminary licenses to broadcast from 90-95 MHz. The first station to go on air in the expanded band was Nankai Broadcasting, which began test broadcasts on 91.7 FM on November 3, 2014.

Receiver issues
Many Japanese radios are designed to be capable of receiving both the Japanese FM band and the CCIR FM band, so that the same model can be sold within Japan or exported. The radio may cover 76 to 108 MHz, the frequency coverage may be selectable by the user, or during assembly the radio may be set to operate on one band by means of a specially-placed diode or other internal component.

Conventional analog-tuned (dial & pointer) radios may be marked with "TV Sound" in the 90-108 section. If these radios were sold in the US, for example, the 76-88 section would be marked TV sound for VHF channels 5 and 6, with the 88-108 section band as audio FM.

Used automobile resale issues
Second-hand automobiles imported from Japan contain a radio designed for the Japanese FM band, and importers often fit a "converter" to down-convert the 87.5-108.0 MHz band to the frequencies that the radio can accept. In addition to showing an incorrect frequency, there are two other disadvantages that can result in undesired performance; the converter cannot down-convert in full the regular international FM band (up to 20.5 MHz wide) to the only 14 MHz wide Japanese band (unless the converter incorporates two user-switchable down-convert modes), and the original antenna may perform poorly on the higher FM band. Another problem is that RDS is not used in Japan, whereas most modern car radios available in Europe use this system. Also the converter may not allow pass-through of the MW band (if desired). A better solution is to replace the radio and antenna with ones designed for the country where the car will be used, but this can be difficult where custom-built radios are fitted.

See also
 List of radio stations in Japan

References

Radio in Japan